Zothantluanga is an Indian politician. He was elected to the Mizoram Legislative Assembly from Aizawl West I in the by-election in 2019 as a member of the Mizo National Front.

References

Living people
Mizo National Front politicians
People from Aizawl
Year of birth missing (living people)
Mizoram MLAs 2018–2023